Jagjit Singh, better known as J. J. Singh (born October 5, 1897 in Rawalpindi, present-day Pakistan; died 1976) was an Indian-American activist and president of the India League of America. He lived in the United States from 1926 to 1959, during which time he ran a successful textile import business in New York City and lobbied for the passage of the Luce–Celler Act of 1946, which permitted Indians to naturalize in the United States.

References

1897 births
1976 deaths
American activists
Indian emigrants to the United States